Ptychopyxis javanica is a plant species in the Euphorbiaceae. It is native to southern Thailand, Vietnam, Peninsular Malaysia, Borneo, Sumatra, and Java.

References

Pycnocomeae
Flora of Asia
Plants described in 1910